Mondoweiss is a news website that began as a general-interest blog written by Philip Weiss on The New York Observer website. It subsequently developed into a broader collaborative venture after fellow journalist Adam Horowitz joined it as co-editor. In 2010, Weiss described the website’s purpose as one of covering American foreign policy in the Middle East from a 'progressive Jewish perspective’. In 2011, it defined its aims as fostering greater fairness for Palestinians in American foreign policy, and as providing American Jews with an alternative identity to that expressed by Zionist ideology, which he regards as antithetical to American liberalism. Originally supported by Type Media Center, it is a part of the Center for Economic Research and Social Change.

Staff
Philip Weiss has written for New York magazine, Harper's Magazine, Esquire, and The New York Observer. He is the author of Cock-a-Doodle-Doo (1996) and American Taboo: A Murder in the Peace Corps (2004). Weiss self identifies on the site as anti-Zionist

Adam Horowitz received his master's degree in Near Eastern Studies from New York University. He later served as the Director of the Israel/Palestine Program for the American Friends Service Committee where he gained "extensive on-the-ground experience in Israel/Palestine". In addition to Mondoweiss, Horowitz has written for The Nation, AlterNet, The Huffington Post, and The Hill.com. He has spoken frequently on the Israeli–Palestinian conflict on campuses and to organizations.

Alex Kane, an assistant editor for Mondoweiss based in New York City, also is the World editor for AlterNet. His work also has appeared in Salon, The Daily Beast, The Electronic Intifada, Extra! and Common Dreams.

Regular contributors include Helena Cobban, Dareen Tatour, Steven Salaita, Alice Rothchild, Haidar Eid, Nada Elia, Yossi Gurvitz and Jonathan Ofir.

Development

In a 2010 interview with The Link, the magazine published by Americans for Middle East Understanding, Philip Weiss described the evolution of Mondoweiss:

In March 2006 I began writing a daily blog on The New York Observer website. My editor, Peter Kaplan, encouraged me to write what was on my mind and it was his idea to call it Mondoweiss. Increasingly what was on my mind were "Jewish issues": the Iraq disaster and my Jewishness, Zionism, neo-conservatism, Israel, Palestine. For many reasons that I detail in "Blogging about Israel and Jewish identity raises Observer hackles" in the spring of 2007 I re-launched my own blog on my own website. It became a collaborative effort a year ago when Adam Horowitz joined Mondoweiss.

In The American Conservative, Weiss detailed his split from The New York Observer and wrote, "Blogging about such matters sometimes made me feel wicked, as though I was betraying my tribe. Shouldn't some thoughts remain private? But I felt that the form demanded transparency about what I cared about, Jewish identity."

On 16 July 2012, Mondoweiss announced it would in a partnership with the popular on-line magazine Salon.

Content
In 2008, after the arrest of Ben-Ami Kadish, who allegedly gave Israel stolen United States secrets on nuclear weapons, fighter jets and missiles in the 1980s, The Jewish Journal of Greater Los Angeles quoted Mondoweiss as writing about an old Government Accountability Office report stating that Israel "conducts the most aggressive espionage operation against the United States of any U.S. ally".

In 2010, James Wolcott wrote in Vanity Fair quoting Weiss in Mondoweiss regarding an Anti-Defamation League statement regarding the planned Park51 project, an Islamic Center near the World Trade Center site. Wolcott quoted Weiss who had written: "It's happened: the Anti-Defamation League has overplayed its hand (in this case, neoconservative Islamophobia) in such a glaring manner that it is being condemned at every quarter."

In 2012, Tablet magazine wrote that the Associated Press had "picked up a story from advocacy blog" Mondoweiss, about Israeli security asking a Palestinian-American to show them her email at Ben-Gurion Airport. Tablet wrote that "more news stories—and this story is undoubtedly newsworthy—are going to come to the attention of non-niche journalists and thereby gain wider notice".

In 2012, Mondoweiss reported that United States Representative Joseph R. Pitts' office had mailed a letter calling on Israeli Prime Minister Ariel Sharon and Palestine National Authority Chair Yasser Arafat to work toward peace in the Middle East. It commented that the congressman seemed to entrust peace negotiations in the Middle East to a dead man, Arafat, and another in a vegetative state, Sharon. The blog pointed out that Sharon had been in a coma since 2006 and Arafat had died in 2004. The representative blamed accidental use of an old form letter.

Funding 
According to the Anti-Defamation League, Mondoweiss and Philip Weiss have received grants from Ron Unz's Unz Foundation.

International Socialist Review (1997)
International Socialist Review (1997), defunct in 2019, was published by the Center for Economic Research and Social Change (CERSC).

The Goldstone Report
Weiss and Horowitz, along with Lizzy Ratner, co-edited the 2011 book The Goldstone Report: The Legacy of the Landmark Investigation of the Gaza Conflict. The Publishers Weekly review noted that the abridged version of the United Nations Fact Finding Mission on the Gaza Conflict ("the Goldstone Report"), included an introduction by Naomi Klein and an "eloquent" foreword by Bishop Desmond Tutu. The review said the book was "enhanced" by oral testimonies which "inject a harrowing human element to counterbalance the report's dispassionate tone". The review called the book "An essential read for those concerned with accurate documentation of historical events and nations' accountability for their treatment of civilians living in war zones". Kirkus Reviews called the book "An eye-opening document and an urgent call for accountability".

In a Democracy Now! interview, Horowitz discussed Richard Goldstone's later correction of one item in his report, his saying "Civilians were not intentionally targeted [by Israel] as a matter of policy." Horowitz said that he viewed this as a minor issue and "[m]uch larger was the issue of intentionally attacking the civilian infrastructure of Gaza, which he doesn't mention, and the idea of just disproportionate and indiscriminate violence, which he doesn't address and which affects civilians disproportionately."

Reception
In March 2007, Gary Kamiya, in an article for the website Salon, wrote that Mondoweiss offered "informed and passionate discussions" of what Weiss stated were "delicate and controversial matters surrounding American Jewish identity and Israel". Kamiya wrote that Weiss, "routinely skewers attempts by mainstream Jewish organizations and pundits to lay down the law on what is acceptable discourse". As an example he mentioned Weiss' exploration of "off-limits" topics like dual loyalty, as in an incident regarding the American Jewish Committee. Weiss had written that a Committee piece accusing Jewish intellectuals who did not "toe the party line on Israel" of being "self-haters" only revealed the "anti-intellectual, vicious, omerta practices of the Jewish leadership".

In 2009, Michael Massing, in an article titled "The News About the Internet" for The New York Review of Books, noted that "Weiss is one of several friends I've seen flourish online after enduring years of frustration writing for magazines. With its unrelenting criticism of Israel, his site [Mondoweiss] has angered even some of his fellow doves, but it has given voice to a strain of opinion that in the past had few chances of being heard."

In November 2009 former United States Senator James G. Abourezk praised Weiss and Horowitz for their courage in taking on "what most believe is an unassailable, monolithic pro-Israel Lobby". He wrote that the blog "hits Israel's illegal occupation where it hurts—in the center of the American Jewish community. Mondoweiss is evidence that more and more American Jews are thinking twice about giving Israel their wholehearted, unquestioning support for the crimes it is committing in the territories it illegally occupies."

In September 2010, James Wolcott of Vanity Fair argued that Mondoweiss "is one of the most invaluable sites in the blogosphere, a blast of sanity and moral suasion against the prevailing demonization of anything and anyone perceived as anti-Israel".

In 2012 Arab News wrote that Weiss and Horowitz had "developed an interactive forum that brims with up-to-the-minute news and comment and makes brilliant attention-grabbing use of text and video material" and that "they bring to their work a moral and intellectual verve woefully missing from coverage of Palestine-Israel issues in even the more respected sections of the mainstream media".

While Mondoweiss has received praise for its content, it has also been criticized, with much of the criticism coming from people and organizations with differing opinions on the Israeli–Palestinian conflict. This criticism has often included allegations of antisemitism.

In 2010, Mondoweiss was criticized by the Jerusalem Center for Public Affairs for publishing a series of cartoons which they stated expressed "anti-Israelism, a more recent category of anti-Semitism".

Between 2010 and 2011, Tablet magazine published three articles, in which Mondoweiss, and other blogs, were criticized. The articles described Weiss as a "Jew-baiter" and "intensely anti-Israel", saying his site was "obsessed with Israel and the machinations of the U.S. Israel lobby", and laden with "sweeping and unsubstantiated rhetoric". 

Weiss responded to allegations in Tablet, by stating that the magazine had "smeared" him and several other bloggers as Jew-baiters. Walt stated that Smith's article contained "not a scintilla of evidence" that "Weiss or I have written or said anything that is remotely anti-Semitic, much less that involves 'Jew-baiting'. There's an obvious reason for this omission: None of us has ever written or said anything that supports Smith's outrageous charges."

In 2012, the Algemeiner Journal described Mondoweiss as "Purveyors of Anti-Semitic Material". 

Armin Rosen, a Media Fellow with The Atlantic, criticized Peter Beinart's blog, Open Zion (which appears in The Daily Beast) for publishing an article by Alex Kane because he is Mondoweisss "Staff Reporter". Rosen wrote that "Mondoweiss often gives the appearance of an anti-Semitic enterprise."

Robert Wright, a Senior Editor at The Atlantic, responded to Rosen's article, writing "This tarring of Kane by virtue of his association with Mondoweiss would be lamentable even if Rosen produced a convincing indictment of Mondoweiss, showing that it indeed evinces anti-Semitism." James Fallows, a national correspondent for The Atlantic concurred with Wright's response to Rosen. Alex Kane, Adam Horowitz, and Philip Weiss responded in Mondoweiss arguing that Rosen's article, "is about nothing more than policing the discourse on Israel".

Later that year, the Algemeiner Journal published another article criticising Mondoweiss for its associations with Judith Butler, because of her comments describing Islamist movements, even those of the militant variety, like Hamas and Hezbollah, as "social movements that are progressive, that are on the Left, that are part of a global Left".

In 2013, Peter Beinart, writing for The Daily Beast, accused Mondoweiss of "ignoring human rights abuse unless it can be linked to America or capitalism or the West", and said that "By admitting that they're more interested in human rights violations when Israel commits them than when Hamas does, Horowitz and Roth are implying that they don't really see human rights as universal".  Later in the year Commentary magazine accused Mondoweiss of being complicit in an "effort to delegitimize Jewish rights".

In 2013, the Israel newspaper Haaretz described Mondoweiss as "a progressive Jewish" website. 

Journalist Bradley Burston, writing for Haaretz, described Mondoweiss as "avowedly anti-Israel" in reference to its coverage of the 2014 kidnapping and murder of Israeli teenagers. 

In 2015, David Bernstein, writing for The Washington Post, called the website a "hate site", and listed quotes from Weiss that he said were anti-Semitic. This included Weiss' claim that "the Israel lobby ... reflected a contract the American establishment had made with Jews to drive the economy in the 1970s", which Bernstein likened to a belief in an "Elders of Zion type group".

According to Elliot Kaufman, the Vice President of Cardinal for Israel, a Stanford University group, writing in The Stanford Review, Mondoweiss "often publishes astonishingly anti-Semitic material, using classic anti-Semitic imagery such as depicting Jews as spiders, cockroaches, or octopuses with tentacles controlling others, and Holocaust inversion. Its hatred of Israel is as deep as it is vicious."

In 2018 Israeli journalist Amira Hass cited Mondoweiss as a must-read venue for those wanting to understand Israeli policy regarding Palestinians.

References

Further reading
 Adam Horowitz, Lizzy Ratner, Philip Weiss (eds.), The Goldstone Report: The Legacy of the Landmark Investigation of the Gaza Conflict, Nation Books, 2011, .

American political websites
American political blogs
Israeli–Palestinian conflict
Jewish anti-Zionism in the United States
Politics of the Middle East